Torno indietro e cambio vita is a 2015 Italian comedy film directed by Carlo Vanzina.

The film is a loose remake of the French film Bis, released previously the same year.

Cast

References

External links

2015 films
Films directed by Carlo Vanzina
2010s Italian-language films
2015 comedy films
Italian comedy films
Italian remakes of French films
2010s Italian films